The 55th annual Berlin International Film Festival was held from February 10–20, 2005. Man to Man by Régis Wargnier served as opening night film. The festival closed with Kinsey by Bill Condon. The Golden Bear was awarded to South African film U-Carmen eKhayelitsha directed by Mark Dornford-May.

The retrospective was dedicated to the scene formers. It was titled Production Design + Film. Locations, Settings, Spaces and was divided into five sections and a total of 45 films were shown at the festival.

Jury 

The following people were announced as being on the jury for the festival:

International Jury
 Roland Emmerich, director, screenwriter and producer (Germany) - Jury President
 Ingeborga Dapkunaite, actress (Lithuania)
 Bai Ling, actress (China)
 Franka Potente, actress (Germany)
 Wouter Barendrecht, producer (Netherlands)
 Nino Cerruti, stylist and entrepreneur (Italy)
 Andrey Kurkov, writer and screenwriter (Ukraine)

International Short Film Jury
 Gabriela Tagliavini, director and screenwriter (Argentina)
 Marten Rabarts, writer and producer (New Zealand)
 Susan Korda, director, editor and producer (United States)

Official selection

In competition
The following films were in competition for the Golden Bear and Silver Bear awards:

Short Film In-competition
The following short films were selected:

Key
{| class="wikitable" width="550" colspan="1"
| style="background:#FFDEAD;" align="center"| †
|Winner of the main award for best film in its section
|-
| colspan="2"| The opening and closing films are screened during the opening and closing ceremonies respectively.
|}

Awards
The following prizes were awarded by the Jury:

Golden Bear
U-Carmen eKhayelitsha: Mark Dornford-May
Silver Bear
Best Film Music – The Beat That My Heart Skipped: Alexandre Desplat
Best Actor – Thumbsucker: Lou Taylor Pucci
Best Actress – Sophie Scholl: The Final Days: Julia Jentsch
Best Director – Sophie Scholl: The Final Days: Marc Rothemund
Best Short Film – The Intervention: Jay Duplass and Jam Session: Izabela Plucinska
Outstanding Artistic Contribution – The Wayward Cloud: Tsai Ming-liang
Jury Grand Prix
Peacock: Gu Changwei
Silver Bear – Honorable Mention
Best Short Film – Don Kishot be'Yerushalaim: Dani Rosenberg
Honorary Golden Bear
Fernando Fernán Gómez
Kwon-taek Im
Berlinale Camera
Daniel Day-Lewis
Katrin Sass
Helene Schwarz
Best Short Film
Milk: Peter Mackie Burns
Panorama Audience Award
Best Feature Film – Live and Become: Radu Mihăileanu
Best Short Film – Hi Maya: Claudia Lorenz
Crystal Bear
Best Short Film – The Djarn Djarns: Wayne Blair
Best Feature Film – Bluebird: Mijke de Jong
14plus: Best Feature Film – Voces inocentes: Luis Mandoki
Crystal Bear – Special Mention
Best Short Film – Does God Play Football: Michael A. Walker and Wind: Erik van Schaaik
Best Feature Film – The Italian: Andrey Kravchuk and The Color of Milk: Torun Lian
14plus: Best Feature Film – Turtles Can Fly: Bahman Ghobadi
FIPRESCI AwardThe Wayward Cloud'': Tsai Ming-liang

References

External links
 55th Berlin International Film Festival on IMDb
 Yearbook for the Berlinale 2005 berlinale.de
 55th Berlin International Film Festival 2005

Berlin International Film Festival
B
B
2005 in Berlin
2005 in German cinema